ʿAlam-Kūh (also: Alam Kooh) – Mount Alam – is a mountain in Alborz mountain range in north of Iran, Mazandaran Province, forming a peak of Takht-e Suleyman Massif. It is located in Kelardasht District of Mazandaran Province of Iran. With an elevation of 4,805 meters, it is the second-highest peak in Iran after Mount Damavand.

Climbing history

The first recorded ascent of the peak was made from Hazarchal over the south face by the German brothers Bornmüller during their six-month botanical exploration of the Alborz in 1902.

Douglas Busk, a British mountaineer,  climbed Alam-Kuh via the east ridge in 1933 and again in 1934 from over the west ridge.

The 800 m high, steep granite north face provides some of the most difficult and interesting mountaineering routes in the country and the climbs rank alongside major climbing routes in the European Alps. In addition to local climbers, the north face attracts European climbing teams. The first known ascent from the north was by a German party (Gorter/Steinauer) in 1936 via the northwest ridge. Subsequently, French and Polish teams established other routes on the north face during the 1960s and 1970, these being multi-day routes of high alpine standard. A British team followed with a successful ascent in 1978. The first winter ascent of the north face was made by Mohammad Nouri in 1991.

2004 earthquake
Most of the fixed ropes were damaged severely during a major 6.3 magnitude earthquake and consequent rockfall in 2004. The mountain was closed to climbers for some months because of the hazard of rockfall and loose cables.

Terrain and approach
The mountain range supports permanent snow and glaciers. Although the southern slopes of the range tend to be dry and barren, the northern valleys leading to the Caspian Sea (which offer the best approaches to the mountains) are wet and lush with vegetation.

Location

See also
 List of Ultras of West Asia
 Alamut

References

External links

 "Alam Kuh, Iran" on Peakbagger
 SummitPost website
 
  "Iran: Alam Kuh" in The American Alpine Journal, 2002

Mountaineering in Iran
Four-thousanders of the Alborz
Glaciers of Iran
Tourist attractions in Mazandaran Province
Mountains of Mazandaran Province